Tumhari Kasam is a 1978 Indian Hindi-language drama film, produced by C.V.K. Sastry on Associated Films & Finance Corporation banner and directed by Ravi Chopra. The film stars Jeetendra and Moushmi Chatterjee, with music composed by Rajesh Roshan.

Plot
Ram Prasad a respected laborer has two children Vidya & Raja. Due to coddle Raja turns into a spoiled brat and his vices lead to his death. Remorseful Raja determines to be fair from now onwards. Later, the sibling moves to Bombay but they detach in between. Raja goes into the clutches of the gang who convert children into beggars anyhow he succeeds in escaping. Vidya joins as a maid in the house of a wealthy couple where their vagabond son Anand lusts her. Besides, advocate Sunil Verma lives with his wife Seema Kapoor who is perturbed as childless. Once Raja regains Seema’s heisted purse keeping his life at risk. Then, they appraise his righteousness and adopt him. In tandem, one-night drunken Anand tries to molest Vidya. In that scrimmage, she hits Sunil's vehicle and loses her eyesight. Sunil requests the doctor to take the necessary steps to recoup her vision and requests her to accompany them. Self-esteemed Vidya politely refuses and joins in a ‘’Ashram’’. Meanwhile, Anand is distressed out of contrition and seeks to find Vidya. Fortuitously, Anand & Sunil are friends thereby, he learns the whereabouts of Vidya. Immediately, he rushes, pleads pardon, and proposes to her when Sunil discovers Raja as Vidya’s brother. At the same time, he is abducted by the gang when Anand rescues him. Finally, the movie ends on a happy note with the marriage of Anand & Vidya who retrieves her eyesight.

Cast
Jeetendra as Anand
Navin Nischol as Sunil Verma 
Moushmi Chatterjee as Vidya
Padmini Kapila as Seema Kapoor
Raju Shrestha as Raja, Vidya's brother 
Vimal Ahuja		
Jagdish Raj as Police Inspector
Prem Sagar as Police Inspector
Achala Sachdev as Anand Mother
Pradeep Kumar as Anand Father
Manmohan Krishna as Ramprasad, Vidya's father
Paintal (comedian) as Bholu, servant Of Sunil Verma
Jankidas as Tikam Seth
Lalita Pawar as Sunil's Aunt
Roopesh Kumar as Goon, who kidnaps and pressure Raja to beg

Soundtrack
The music is by Rajesh Roshan with lyrics by Anand Bakshi. The songs are sung by Asha Bhosle, Kishore Kumar, Lata Mangeshkar, Mukesh and Preeti Sagar.

External links
 

1978 films
Films scored by Rajesh Roshan
1970s Hindi-language films